"Surprise" is episode 13 of season two of the television series Buffy the Vampire Slayer. It was written by Marti Noxon and first broadcast on January 19, 1998. "Surprise" is part one of a two part story. Part two, "Innocence", was broadcast the next day.

Plot 
Buffy has a vivid dream where a very undead Drusilla dusts Angel, which she fears is prophetic and realizes that Spike and Drusilla may still be alive. Oz finally asks Willow out on a date. She accepts, but remembers the Scoobies are planning a surprise party for Buffy's 17th birthday and instead invites him to the party. Elsewhere, Drusilla, strong as Buffy dreamed, arranges her own gala event, while Spike, using a wheelchair but quite undead as well, directs his gang to collect scattered pieces of the demon Judge to reassemble for her present.

Jenny Calendar gets a visit from her mysterious uncle Enyos who reveals her Gypsy past, and they discuss her responsibilities in ensuring Angel's continued suffering. Enyos orders Jenny to separate Angel from the Slayer. On their way to Buffy's surprise party, she and Jenny intercept a piece of the Judge and bring it to the party, deducing Drusilla's plot. Following her Gypsy orders, Jenny encourages Angel on his mission to prevent the dire consequences of reassembly – he must take the Judge's arm by cargo ship to "the remotest region possible". While Angel gives Buffy a Claddagh ring for her birthday during their tearful parting at the dock, Spike's vamps manage to steal the arm back, scrubbing the mission.

Later at the library, Buffy has another informative dream, and takes Angel to investigate Spike and Drusilla's lair at the factory. They discover the Judge is fully assembled and activated, and Spike and Drusilla capture and taunt the two, debating who will die first. They narrowly escape into the sewer system, then return to Angel's apartment exhausted and drenched from the rain. Still suffering from successive threats of losing one another, Angel and Buffy confess feelings each has been trying to suppress. They make love for the first time and fall asleep in each other's arms. Suddenly, in a flash of lightning and a crash of thunder, Angel bolts awake and runs out into the storm, calling Buffy's name in anguish.

Continuity
Oz and Willow have their first date, commencing one of the longest relationships on the show.
 
Angel is transformed into Angelus, becoming the Big Bad of season 2.
 
Spike and Drusilla are established as worthy adversaries, allowing for Spike's eventual return appearances in seasons 3 and 4; and for his permanent placement as a regular cast member for seasons 5, 6, and 7.
 
Buffy's birthday gift from Angel, her Claddagh ring, not only comes to signify her lost love for the rest of season 2, but also plays an important part in the beginning of season 3. First as a resonant antecedent to Scott Hope's impromptu gift, and then as a mystical focus for Angel's return from Acathla's hell dimension.

References

External links 

 

Buffy the Vampire Slayer (season 2) episodes
1998 American television episodes
Television episodes written by Marti Noxon